Nicholas Jeremy Rowland Cross (born 7 February 1961) is an English former professional footballer who played as a forward. He scored 128 goals in 481 league games in a sixteen-year career in the Football League, playing for five different clubs.

He began his career at top-flight West Bromwich Albion in 1980, and played more than 100 games in a five-year spell, before moving on to Walsall for a £48,000 fee. He also played more than 100 games for Walsall, scoring 45 league goals, before he was sold on to Leicester City for a £80,000 fee in January 1988. He was sold on to Port Vale for a £125,000 fee in June 1989, and would play a total of 176 games for the club in league and cup competitions, winning the Football League Trophy in 1993, and helping the club to promotion out of the Third Division in 1993–94. After this success he spent two years with Hereford United, before heading into non-league football with Solihull Borough in 1996. He later managed Redditch United and Studley KBL, before heading into the financial sector.

Career

West Bromwich Albion
Cross started his career at First Division side West Bromwich Albion in 1980, as the club finished fourth in the league under Ron Atkinson in 1980–81. The club struggled under Ronnie Allen's stewardship in 1981–82, avoiding relegation by only two points. They went on to finish in mid-table in 1982–83 under Ron Wylie, before Wylie was replaced by Johnny Giles in February 1984. At the end of the 1983–84 campaign, West Brom avoided relegation by a narrow three-point margin. At the end of the 1984–85 season, Cross left The Hawthorns to sign with Walsall, who paid a £48,000 transfer fee. He had played a total of 105 league games for West Brom, scoring 15 goals.

Walsall
Dropping from the top-flight down to Alan Buckley's Third Division "Saddlers", Cross finished the 1985–86 season as the club's top-scorer with 21 goals. Walsall pushed for promotion in 1986–87 under new manager Tommy Coakley, but finished three points off the play-offs. Walsall would win promotion out of the play-offs in 1988, though Cross left the club before the end of the 1987–88 campaign. He had played a total of 109 league games for Walsall, scoring 45 goals.

Leicester City
In January 1988, Cross signed with David Pleat's Leicester City for a £80,000 fee so as to provide support for Mike Newell in attack. He became a favourite of Pleat, ahead of Jimmy Quinn in the first-team pecking order. The "Foxes" posted comfortable mid-table finishes in 1987–88 and 1988–89; Cross made a total of 58 league appearances, scoring 15 goals.

Port Vale
Cross signed with Leicester's newly promoted Second Division rivals Port Vale for a £125,000 fee in June 1989. He went straight into the first team at Vale, and played a total of 50 games in 1989–90, scoring 15 goals. His first goal for the club came against former club Leicester, in a 2–1 win at Vale Park on 7 October. He scored braces in wins against Barnsley, Plymouth Argyle, and Brighton & Hove Albion, and also netted the winner against top-flight Derby County in an FA Cup Third Round replay at the Baseball Ground. He played 22 games in 1990–91, scoring three goals, until he was sidelined for fourteen months after he damaged his knee ligaments in December. He returned to action at the end of the 1991–92 campaign, playing eight games as the "Valiants" were relegated into the Third Division (which was immediately renamed the Second Division due to the creation of the Premier League).

He was a key first team member again in the club's 1992–93 promotion push, scoring 12 goals in 47 games. He scored against former club West Brom on 27 February, in a 2–1 home victory. However Vale finished third in the league, and faced the "Baggies" again in the play-off Final at Wembley Stadium on 30 May; Cross was a substitute as Vale lost 3–0 after going down to ten men. Eight days earlier though, Vale had beaten Stockport County at Wembley in the final of the Football League Trophy – Cross was an unused substitute. The club went on to finish the 1993–94 campaign as Second Division runners-up, and were thus promoted; Cross contributed twelve goals to the success, half of which came in the space of three consecutive October league games against Wrexham, Hull City, and Blackpool – later in the season he scored another brace against Blackpool in the return fixture.

Later career
At age 33 he was given a free transfer to Hereford United in May 1994; he had scored a total of 43 goals in 176 games for Port Vale in all competitions. He would play a total of 85 games for the "Bulls" in all competitions, scoring 18 goals, as they posted a sixteenth-place finish in 1994–95, before missing out on promotion out of the Third Division in 1995–96 after losing out to Darlington at the play-off semi-final stage. Following this disappointment he joined non-league side Solihull Borough. He helped Solihull to reach the First Round of the FA Cup for the second time in their history in 1997–98, and scored in both their 1–1 draw with Darlington at Feethams, and the 3–3 draw in the replay at Damson Park – Darlington won the resulting penalty shoot-out.

Style of play
Cross was a tenacious and intelligent forward who could hold the ball up well to make up for his lack of pace and dominance in the air.

Post-retirement
After hanging up his boots as a player, he managed non-league sides Redditch United and Studley KBL, before leaving the game completely in 2004, to work in finance.

Career statistics

Honours
Port Vale
Football League Trophy: 1993
Football League Third Division second-place promotion: 1993–94

References

1961 births
Living people
Footballers from Birmingham, West Midlands
English footballers
Association football forwards
West Bromwich Albion F.C. players
Walsall F.C. players
Leicester City F.C. players
Port Vale F.C. players
Hereford United F.C. players
Solihull Borough F.C. players
English Football League players
Southern Football League players
English football managers
Redditch United F.C. managers